Marguerite Marie Françoise Louise d'Orléans, Duchesse de Magenta (25 January 1869 – 31 January 1940) was a member of the House of Orléans, daughter of Prince Robert d'Orléans, Duke of Chartres and Princess Françoise d'Orléans. She bore the courtesy title of Princess of Orleans.

Early life

Princess Marguerite was born at Morgan House, Ham, in Richmond, London, to Prince Robert of Chartres and Princess Françoise, both grandchildren of the French King, Louis Philippe I of France.

Marriage and Issue

She married Marie Armand Patrice de Mac Mahon, 2nd Duke de Magenta, in a civil ceremony on 22 April 1896 at the town hall of the 8th arrondissement of Paris with a religious ceremony the next day in the chapel of the Château de Chantilly.

Marguerite and Marie Armand had three children:

Marie Elisabeth (19 June 1899, Luneville - 28 September 1951, Voreppe, Isère), married Henri Marie Léon de Plan, Count of Sieyès (6 November 1883, Aix-en-Provence - 23 June 1953, Château de la Forêt, Montcresson), on 22 September 1924 in Paris
Amélie Françoise Marie (11 September 1900, Luneville - 30 May 1987, Castle of Rambuteau), recipient of the Resistance Medal, Chevalier of the Legion of Honour, married Almeric Philibert Marie Emmanuel Lombard de Buffières, Count of Rambuteau (29 August 1890, Geneva - 14 December 1944, Concentration camp of Buchenwald), on 5 February 1921 in Paris
Maurice Jean Marie, 3rd Duke of Magenta (13 November 1903, Luneville - 27 October 1954, Evreux), married Countess Marguerite Riquet de Caraman-Chimay (29 December 1913, Paris - 1 September 1990, Nice ) on 25 August 1937 at the Château de Sully. Had issue, including:
Philippe Maurice Marie, 4th  Duke of Magenta (15 May 1938, Paris - 24 January 2002, Paris ), he married firstly, Claire-Marguerite Schindler (born: 1 August 1953, Geneva), on 15 February 1978 in Mollis, Switzerland (divorced in 1990). He married secondly Amelia Margaret Mary Drummond (born: 2 July 1963, Glencarse), on 4 May 1990 in London, she was the daughter of Humphrey ap Evans (later, Drummond of Megginch) and Cherry Drummond, 16th Baroness Strange. He had two children from each marriage:
Adelaide Philippine Jeanne Marie (born: 3 October 1978, Autun) married Romain Armand Philippe Marie Joseph Pezet de Corval (born: 1979), on 3 April 2004 in Lusigny in a Civil ceremony and a religious ceremony on the following 15 May in the Sainte-Marie-Madeleine basilica of Saint-Maximin-la-Sainte-Baume
Eléonore Philippine Jeanne Marie (born: 18 November 1980, Boulogne-Billancourt)
Pélagie Jeanne Marie Marguerite Charlotte Nathalie (born on 24 June 1990 at the Château de Sully)
Maurice Marie Patrick Bacchus Humphrey, 5th Duke of Magenta (born on 30 March 1992 at Beaune)
Nathalie Jeanne Marie (11 April 1939, Paris - 25 February 2006, Évreux)
Anne Monique Marie (9 August 1941, Château de Sully - 11 April 2003, Neuilly), married Gérard Louis Jacques Arnould Thénard, Baron Thénard (born on 3 March 1940, Neuilly), on 5 October 1963 (divorced on 22 May 1985)
Patrice Michel Marie (born on 11 September 1943, Lausanne), married Beatrix Bénigne Marie Anne de Blanquet du Chayla (born on 27 March 1945, Tain-l'Hermitage), on 11 June 1966 in Beaumont-le-Roger
Diane Marguerite Marie (born on 18 September 1968, Paris), a French television personality, married firstly Frédéric Beigbeder (born on 21 September 1965, Neuilly), on 17 May 1991 in Paradou, they were divorced on 6 March 1996. Married secondly Guillaume Durand (born on 23 September 1952, Boulogne-Billancourt) on 8 April 2009 in Paris
Elisabeth Jeanne Marie (born on 7 October 1970, Paris), married Philippe Edouard Bruno Lamblin (born on 12 December 1968, Saint-Mandé), on 24 March 2000 in Paradou
Sophie Jeanne Marie (born on 26 May 1973, Boulogne-Billancourt), married Esteban Juan Blanco y Theux (born on 1 June 1966, Valencia Spain), on 11 July 1997 in Paradou
Amélie Marie Victoire (born on 12 March 1976, Boulogne-Billancourt), married Hubert Clicquot de Mentque (born on 6 October 1974, Pau), on 6 October 2007 in Paradou

Ancestry

Titles

Titles born by members of the House of Orleans born after 1848 have no legal existence in France and are considered courtesy titles.

25 January 1869 - 22 April 1896: Her Royal Highness Princess Marguerite d'Orléans22 April 1896 - 31 January 1940: Her Royal Highness the Duchess of Magenta

References

1869 births
1940 deaths
French duchesses
French princesses
House of Orléans